Army of the Universe is an Italian industrial dance band, now located in Los Angeles, formed in 2008 by trance and techno producer Albert Vorne (aka Trebla) and vocalist Lord K, lead singer of Kult of the Skull God.  The band also includes guitarist Dave Tavecchia. and drummer Giuseppe Amato.

Style
The band has been described as similar in style to industrial bands of the 1990s such as Nine Inch Nails and Ministry.

Touring
The band toured with KMFDM in North America in August, 2011., and supported Skinny Puppy on the February leg of their 2014 Live Shapes for Arms tour.
They also toured with The Birthday Massacre in their Under Your Spell Tour in 2017

Band members
 Albert Vorne - keyboards, backing vocals, programming
 Lord K - lead vocals
 Dave Tavecchia - guitars, backing vocals
 Giuseppe Amato - drums

Discography
 Lovedead (EP) (2008)
 Mother Ignorance (2011)
 The Hipster Sacrifice (2013)
 The Magic (EP) (2016)
 1999 & The Aftershow (2016)

References

External links
 Official site
 Official Myspace
 Official Facebook

2008 establishments in Italy
Italian industrial music groups
Musical groups established in 2008
Musical groups from Milan
Musical quartets
Metropolis Records artists